Kargah-e Mahal Ahdas Shahrak ol Zahra (also Romanized as Kārgāh-e Maḩal Āḩdās̄ Shahrak ol Zahrā) is a village in Kushk-e Qazi Rural District, in the Central District of Fasa County, Fars Province, Iran. At the 2006 census, its population was 162, in 36 families.

References 

Populated places in Fasa County